Rathcoffey is a Gaelic Athletic Association (GAA) club in County Kildare, Ireland. Teresa Lynch, Nuala Malone and Eileen Reilly were selected on the Kildare camogie team of the century. Rathcoffey are currently a junior team in Kildare and are competing in the third league division of Kildare.

Rathcoffey forms St Edward’s along with Straffan for underage purposes and St Edward's fields teams at all levels from Under 9 to Under 21.

Honours
 Kildare Junior Hurling Championship 1935
 Kildare Junior Football Championship: 1969, 1990

Bibliography
 Kildare GAA: A Centenary History, by Eoghan Corry, CLG Chill Dara, 1984,  hb  pb
 Kildare GAA yearbook, 1972, 1974, 1978, 1979, 1980 and 2000- in sequence especially the Millennium yearbook of 2000
 Soaring Sliothars: Centenary of Kildare Camogie 1904-2004 by Joan O'Flynn Kildare County Camogie Board.

References

External links
Kildare GAA site
Kildare GAA club sites
Kildare on Hoganstand.com

Gaelic games clubs in County Kildare
Gaelic football clubs in County Kildare
Hurling clubs in County Kildare